Marnix van den Broeke (born 24 February 1976 in Axel) is a Dutch actor and stuntman.

After an education in dance at the Fontys dance academy in Tilburg, he joined in 1999 the Dutch National Ballet in Amsterdam, where he has lived since. He was first cast in a movie as the werewolf in Harry Potter and the Prisoner of Azkaban in 2004. Since then he is notable for a recurring appearance as the physical Death (the character was voiced by Ian Richardson and later Christopher Lee) in Hogfather (2006) and The Colour of Magic (2008) He also appeared in Terry Pratchett's Going Postal (2010) as Mr. Pump who was voiced by Nicholas Farrell. He also appeared as the Shadow in Inkheart (2008) and the Silence in the Series 6 premiere and finale of Doctor Who.

Partial filmography

External links
Personal website

1976 births
Living people
Dutch male film actors
Dutch male television actors
Dutch stunt performers
People from Terneuzen
Dutch male ballet dancers
21st-century Dutch male actors